Kanhu Charan Jena (27 February 1920 – 21 February 2000) was an Indian politician. He was elected to the Lok Sabha, the lower house of the Parliament of India from the Bhadrak in Odisha as a member of the Indian National Congress.

References

External links
Official Biographical Sketch in Lok Sabha Website

1920 births
2000 deaths
Indian National Congress politicians
India MPs 1952–1957
India MPs 1957–1962
India MPs 1962–1967
Lok Sabha members from Odisha
People from Balasore district
People from Bhadrak
Indian National Congress politicians from Odisha